Coşkun Demirbakan (born 10 November 1954) is a retired Turkish football defender and a UEFA Pro Licensed manager.

References

1954 births
Living people
Turkish footballers
Malatyaspor footballers
Eskişehirspor footballers
Fenerbahçe S.K. footballers
Sakaryaspor footballers
Association football defenders
Turkey international footballers
Turkish football managers
Sakaryaspor managers
Alanyaspor managers
Malatyaspor managers
Eskişehirspor managers
Diyarbakırspor managers
Antalyaspor managers
Fethiyespor managers
Boluspor managers
Kocaelispor managers
Altay S.K. managers
Elazığspor managers
Adanaspor managers